Volleyball at the 2019 Southeast Asian Games in the Philippines were held from 28 November to 10 December 2019. The 2019 Games featured competitions in four events.

Participating nations
A total of 197 athletes from 9 nations participated (the numbers of athletes are shown in parentheses).

Competition schedule
Indoor volleyball events were held from 2 to 10 December 2019, while beach volleyball events were held from 29 November to 5 December 2019.

Venues
The PhilSports Arena at the PhilSports Complex hosted indoor volleyball. PhilSports Arena was chosen as venue for indoor volleyball but the plan was originally revised to give way to host gymnastics events which needed a bigger venue than volleyball at the Ninoy Aquino Stadium. However, it was later reverted to PhilSports Arena during the announcement of the volleyball draw.

Indoor volleyball

Men's tournament

The tournament featured 7 countries. The format was the same as 2017; there was a group of three or four with round-robin format. The top two of group played in the semifinal round. The winners of the semifinal round played for the gold medal and the losers played for the bronze.

Women's tournament

The tournament featured 4 countries. There was a group of four with round-robin format. The top two of group played for the gold medal and the third and fourth place of group played for the bronze medal.

Beach volleyball

Men's tournament

The tournament featured 8 countries separated into 2 Pools with round robin format. Each country has 2 pairs of players playing in a best of 3 set match. The top two of group played in the semifinal round. The winners of the semifinal round played for the gold medal and the losers played for the bronze.

Women's tournament

Medalists

Medal table

References

External links